This is a list of the Austrian empresses, archduchesses, duchesses and margravines, wives of the rulers of Austria. The monarchy in Austria was abolished at the end of the First World War in 1918.

The different titles lasted just a little under a millennium, 976 to 1918.

Margravine of Austria

House of Babenberg

Duchess of Austria

House of Babenberg

Interregnum

House of Habsburg 
{| width=95% class="wikitable"
!width = "8%" | Picture
!width = "10%" | Name 
!width = "9%" | Father
!width = "10%" | Birth
!width = "9%" | Marriage 
!width = "9%" | Became Duchess
!width = "9%" | Ceased to be Duchess
!width = "9%" | Death
!width = "6%" | Spouse
|-
|align=center|  
|align=center| Gertrude of Hohenberg
|align="center"| Burchard V, Count of Hohenburg(Burchardinger)
|align="center"| 1225 
|align="center"| 1245 
|align="center"| November 1276husband's accession
|align="center" colspan="2"| 16 February 1281 
|align="center"| Rudolf I
|-
|align=center|  
|align=center| Elisabeth of Gorizia-Tyrol
|align="center"| Meinhard, Duke of Carinthia(Gorizia)
|align="center"| c. 1262 
|align="center"| 20 December 1274 
|align="center"| December 1282husband's accession25 May 1300consort jointly with daughter-in-law 1 March 1305alone16 October 1306consort jointly with daughter-in-law3/4 July 1307alone
|align="center"| 1 May 1308husband's death 
|align="center"| 28 October 1312 
|align="center"| Albert I
|-
|align=center|  
|align=center| Blanche of France
|align="center"| Philip III of France(Direct Capetians)
|align="center"| c. 1282
|align="center" colspan="2"| 25 May 1300consort jointly with mother-in-law
|align="center" colspan="2"| 1 March 1305
|align="center" rowspan="2"| Rudolph III
|-
|align=center|  
|align=center| Elisabeth Richeza of Poland
|align="center"| Przemysl II of Poland(Piast)
|align="center"| 1 September 1286 
|align="center" colspan="2"| 16 October 1306consort jointly with mother-in-law
|align="center"| 3/4 July 1307husband's death 
|align="center"| 18 October 1335
|-
|align=center| 
|align=center| Isabella of Aragon
|align="center"| James II of Aragon(Barcelona)
|align="center"| 1305 
|align="center" colspan="2"| 11 May 1315 consort jointly with sister-in-law28 February 1326alone
|align="center"| 13 January 1330husband's death|align="center"| 12 July 1330 
|align="center"| Frederick I
|-
|align=center| 
|align=center| Catherine of Savoy
|align="center"| Burchard V, Count of Hohenburg(Burchardinger)
|align="center"| 1304
|align="center" colspan="2"| c. 1315consort jointly with sister-in-law
|align="center"| 28 February 1326husband's death|align="center"| 30 September 1336
|align="center"| Leopold I
|-
|align=center| 
|align=center| Joanna of Pfirt
|align="center"| Ulrich III, Count of Pfirt(Scarponnois-Montbelliard)
|align="center"| 1300
|align="center"| 15 February 1324
|align="center"| 13 January 1330consort jointly with sister-in-law25 March 1330alone16 February 1335<small>consort jointly with sister-in-law3 September 1338alone
|align="center" colspan="2"| 15 November 1351
|align="center"| Albert II
|-
|align=center| 
|align=center| Elisabeth of Bavaria
|align="center"| Stephen I, Duke of Bavaria(Wittelsbach)
|align="center"| 1306 
|align="center"| 15 May 1325
|align="center"| 13 January 1330consort jointly with sister-in-law
|align="center" colspan="2"| 25 March 1330
|align="center" rowspan="2"| Otto
|-
|align=center| 
|align=center| Anne of Bohemia
|align="center"| John of Bohemia(Luxembourg)
|align="center"| 27 March 1323
|align="center" colspan="2"| 25 March 1330consort jointly with sister-in-law
|align="center" colspan="2"| 3 September 1338
|-
|align=center| 
|align=center| Catherine of Bohemia
|align="center"| Charles IV, Holy Roman Emperor(Luxembourg)
|align="center"| 19 August 1342
|align="center"| c. 1350?
|align="center"| 16 August 1358husband's accession|align="center"| 27 July 1365husband's death|align="center"| 26 April 1395
|align="center"| Rudolph IV
|-
|align=center| 
|align=center| Elisabeth of Bohemia
|align="center"| Charles IV, Holy Roman Emperor(Luxembourg)
|align="center"| 19 April 1358
|align="center" colspan="2"| after 19 March 1366consort jointly with sister-in-law
|align="center" colspan="2"| 4 September 1373
|align="center" rowspan="2"| Albert III
|-
|align=center| 
|align=center| Beatrice of Nuremberg
|align="center"| Frederick V, Burgrave of Nuremberg(Hohenzollern)
|align="center"| 1362
|align="center" colspan="2"| 1375consort jointly with sister-in-law
|align="center"| 9 September 1379Treaty of Neuberg|align="center"| 10 June 1414
|-
|align=center| 
|align=center| Viridis Visconti
|align="center"| Bernabò Visconti, Lord of Milan(Visconti)
|align="center"| 1352
|align="center"| 23 February 1365
|align="center"| 27 July 1365aloneafter 19 March 1366consort jointly with sister-in-law4 September 1373alonec. 1375consort jointly with sister-in-law
|align="center"| 9 September 1379Treaty of Neuberg|align="center"| 1 March 1414
|align="center"| Leopold III
|-
|}

 Albertinian Line 
Albert III received the Archduchy of Austria, later called Lower Austria.

 Leopoldinian line 

 Main line 
Leopold III received the Duchies of Styria, Carinthia and Carniola, the County of Tyrol and Further Austria.

In 1406, the Leopoldinian lines split their territories:

 Ernestine line 
The Ernestine line received the Duchies of Styria, Carinthia and Carniola, also called Inner Austria:

 Elder Tyrolean line 
The Elder Tyrolean Line received Tyrol and soon also Further Austria. These territories were also called Upper Austria:

Claimant Duchesses
Matthias Corvinus, King of Hungary, claimed the Austrian territories and occupied Austria proper and Styria. Claiming the title "Duke of Austria", he resided in Vienna from 1485 to his death in 1490.

Archduchess of Austria

House of Habsburg

 Lower Austria 
Lower Austria (Austria proper) passed to Ferdinand's 1st son Maximilian:

Upper Austria
Upper Austria (Tyrol, Further Austria) passed to Emperor Ferdinand's 2nd son Ferdinand:

Inner Austria
Inner Austria ("Inner-Österreich") (Styria, Carinthia and Carniola) passed to Emperor Ferdinand's 3rd son Charles:

Reunited and redivided, again
The Austrian territories were reunited again by inheritance in 1619 under Ferdinand III, Archduke of Inner Austria, but in 1623 five years into the Thirty Years' War he had so much to do with, Ferdinand divided them yet again, when he made his younger brother Leopold, who had been governor over Upper Austria, Archduke of those territories.

Lower Austria
Lower Austria and Inner Austria remained with the elder line (Ferdinand II, Holy Roman Emperor):

Upper Austria
Upper Austria passed to the Younger Tyrolean Line:

 United again The Austrian territories were conclusively reunited in 1665 under:''

House of Habsburg-Lorraine

Archduchess of Austria-Este

Empress of Austria

House of Habsburg-Lorraine

Titular Empress of Austria

House of Habsburg-Lorraine (since 1918)

See also 

List of Holy Roman Empresses (813/814-1804)
List of German queens
List of Italian queens
List of Burgundian consorts
List of Hungarian consorts
List of Bohemian consorts

References

 
 
Austrian
Austrian
Austrian
Consorts